Fur of Flying is a 2010 3D computer-animated Looney Tunes short film featuring the characters Wile E. Coyote and the Road Runner. Directed by Matthew O'Callaghan and written by Tom Sheppard, the film was first shown in theaters before Warner Bros.' feature-length film Legend of the Guardians: The Owls of Ga'Hoole. In 2014, Warner Bros. Animation published this short on YouTube.

Plot 
Using a makeshift helicopter-helmet, Wile E. Coyote intends to catch Road Runner while avoiding heat-seeking missiles. The start shows boxes bearing labels of various Acme products. Coyote uses the boxed items to create a wooden helicopter-helmet that he employs to chase the Road Runner. He encounters various environmental obstacles during the chase, including a cactus and rocky protrusions in a narrow canyon. Coyote and the Road Runner enter a restricted area, and 2 missiles are launched to chase them. The red one chases the Road Runner as the blue one stays after Coyote. Coyote ends up on a very high rock with the missile suspending on a branch just above him. Coyote's helmet accidentally activates, carrying him up to the missile, triggering its detonation. The rock breaks, sending Coyote into the path of the missile chasing the Road Runner. The helicopter-helmet comes loose, dooming Coyote to be hit by the remaining missile. He holds up a burnt yellow "That's All Folks!" sign before passing out.

Release 
Fur of Flying was released theatrically with Legend of the Guardians: The Owls of Ga'Hoole. The short was also released on the Legend of the Guardians DVD and Blu-ray.

The short was included on the Looney Tunes Super Stars' Road Runner and Wile E. Coyote: Supergenius Hijinks DVD. It was also included as a bonus on the DVD release of Looney Tunes: Rabbits Run.

References

External links 
 
 Fur of Flying on YouTube

2010 3D films
2010 short films
2010 computer-animated films
2010s American animated films
2010s animated short films
American comedy short films
American aviation films
Looney Tunes shorts
Wile E. Coyote and the Road Runner films
Reel FX Creative Studios short films
Short films directed by Matthew O'Callaghan
Films scored by Christopher Lennertz
Warner Bros. Animation animated short films
3D animated short films
2010s Warner Bros. animated short films
Animated films without speech
American animated short films
Films about Canis
Animated films about mammals
Animated films about birds